Jenő Brandi (13 May 1913 in Budapest – 4 December 1980 in Budapest) was a Hungarian water polo player who competed in the 1936 Summer Olympics and in the 1948 Summer Olympics.

In 1936 he was part of the Hungarian team which won the gold medal. He played six matches including the final.

Twelve years later he won the silver medal with the Hungarian team. At the London Games he played three matches.

See also
 Hungary men's Olympic water polo team records and statistics
 List of Olympic champions in men's water polo
 List of Olympic medalists in water polo (men)

External links
 

1913 births
1980 deaths
Water polo players from Budapest
Hungarian male water polo players
Water polo players at the 1936 Summer Olympics
Water polo players at the 1948 Summer Olympics
Olympic gold medalists for Hungary in water polo
Olympic silver medalists for Hungary in water polo
Medalists at the 1948 Summer Olympics
Medalists at the 1936 Summer Olympics